The Flat Hat Club is the popular name of a collegiate secret society and honor fraternity founded in 1750 at the College of William and Mary in Williamsburg, Virginia.  The fraternity, formally named the "F.H.C. Society", was founded at the College on November 11, 1750. The society maintains relationships  with societies at the University of St. Andrews and Amherst College.

The F.H.C. Society is the first recorded collegiate secret society in the United States of America.  Early in the 20th century, the Education section of The New York Times profiled America's oldest university clubs and societies and included a letter (now in the archives held at Swem Library) which Thomas Jefferson wrote to Thomas McAuley, mentioning Jefferson's own membership of the F.H.C.

History of the original society
The initials of the F.H.C. Society stand for a secret Latin phrase, likely "Fraternitas, Humanitas, et Cognitio" or "Fraternitas Humanitas Cognitioque" (two renderings of "brotherhood, humanity, and knowledge"). The "brothers" of the original F.H.C. devised and employed a secret handshake, wore a silver membership medal, issued certificates of membership, and met regularly for discussion and fellowship, especially at the Raleigh Tavern. The group became publicly known by the backronym "Flat Hat Club" in probable allusion to the mortarboard caps then commonly worn by all students at the College (now worn at graduation by students at most American universities).

William & Mary alumnus and third American president Thomas Jefferson may be the most famous member of the Flat Hat Club.  (Other notable members of the original group included Colonel James Innes, St. George Tucker, and George Wythe.)  Late in life, Jefferson noted that, "[w]hen I was a student of Wm. & Mary college of this state, there existed a society called the F.H.C. society, confined to the number of six students only, of which I was a member, but it had no useful object, nor do I know whether it now exists."

A second Latin-letter fraternity, the P.D.A. Society (publicly known as "Please Don't Ask"), was founded at William and Mary in March, 1773, in imitation of the F.H.C. Society.  John Heath, a student at William and Mary who in 1776 sought but was refused admission to the P.D.A., later established the first Greek-letter fraternity, the Phi Beta Kappa Society.

The student members of the F.H.C. suspended the activities of the group in 1781, probably as a result of the suspension of academic exercises at the university as the contending armies of the American Revolution approached Williamsburg during the Yorktown campaign.

"The memory of this fraternity had entirely died out at William and Mary, but [after 1909, there was a] discovery of certain manuscript material in the correspondence of St. George Tucker, who was a student of the College in 1772. . . .  These manuscripts consist of (1) a letter of Mr. Jefferson, written to John D. Taylor, of Maryland, giving some account of the club at the College, stating that he was a member . . . [;] (2) a list of the books described as compiled for the club's library, in 1772, by Rev. Thomas Gwatkin, Professor of Mathematics; (3) the credentials of Robert Baylor as a member in abbreviated Latin."  Therefore, we know the society existed for some years, and possessed a small library.

History of the subsequent society
The name of the group was revived in the twentieth century by application to a select group of twelve undergraduate men and four professors which had been founded in 1916 as the Spotswood Club (it thus differed markedly from the original society, a fraternity of six undergraduate men with alumnus members in urbe -- that is, "in town", having graduated from the university).  This society operated largely as a collegiate honorary society.  It suspended its activities in 1943 as the number of men enrolled at the College steeply declined because of American involvement in World War II.

The modern F.H.C. Society was revived in May, 1972.  It remains an all-male society, consisting of twelve undergraduate men and alumni in urbe. In recent years, an additional six members were added. Most of its activities remain comparatively secret within the university. Upon graduation from William and Mary, members receive medals of distinction, showing their membership.  Contrary to the practice of some similar societies, alumni may disclose their membership after graduation.

See also
Collegiate secret societies in North America

Notes

References
 
 Jane Carson, James Innes and His Brothers of the F.H.C.; Charlottesville, Virginia: The University Press of Virginia, 1965.

External links
 Thomas Jefferson's letter to Thomas McAuley regarding the F.H.C. Society, June 14, 1819.
Flat Hat History from The Flat Hat, William and Mary's student newspaper
F.H.C. Society Collection at the Special Collections Research Center, Earl Gregg Swem Library, College of William and Mary.

Organizations established in 1750
1750 establishments in the Thirteen Colonies
College of William & Mary student life
Collegiate secret societies
Student societies in the United States
Student organizations established in the 18th century